The 1989 Australian Open was a tennis tournament played on outdoor hard courts at Flinders Park in Melbourne in Victoria in Australia. It was the 77th edition of the Australian Open and was held from 16 through 29 January 1989.

Seniors

Men's singles

 Ivan Lendl defeated  Miloslav Mečíř 6–2, 6–2, 6–2
 It was Lendl's 7th career Grand Slam title and his 1st Australian Open title.

Women's singles

 Steffi Graf defeated  Helena Suková 6–4, 6–4
 It was Graf's 6th career Grand Slam title and her 2nd Australian Open title.

Men's doubles

 Rick Leach /  Jim Pugh defeated  Darren Cahill /  Mark Kratzmann 6–4, 6–4, 6–4
 It was Leach's 2nd career Grand Slam title and his 2nd Australian Open title. It was Pugh's 4th career Grand Slam title and his 3rd Australian Open title.

Women's doubles

 Martina Navratilova /  Pam Shriver defeated  Patty Fendick /  Jill Hetherington 3–6, 6–3, 6–2
 It was Navratilova's 52nd career Grand Slam title and her 11th Australian Open title. It was Shriver's 21st career Grand Slam title and her 7th and last Australian Open title.

Mixed doubles

 Jana Novotná /  Jim Pugh defeated  Zina Garrison /  Sherwood Stewart 6–3, 6–4
 It was Novotná's 3rd career Grand Slam title and her 2nd Australian Open title. It was Pugh's 5th career Grand Slam title and his 4th Australian Open title.

Juniors

Boys' singles

 Nicklas Kulti defeated  Todd Woodbridge 6–2, 6–0

Girls' singles

 Kim Kessaris defeated  Andrea Farley 6–1, 6–2

 Kessaris was the first and only American junior ever to win this event.

Boys' doubles

 Johan Anderson /  Todd Woodbridge defeated  Andrew Kratzmann /  Jamie Morgan 6–4, 6–2

Girls' doubles

 Andrea Strnadová /  Eva Švíglerová defeated  Nicole Pratt /  Angie Woolcock 6–2, 6–0

External links
 Australian Open official website

 
 

 
1989 in Australian tennis
January 1989 sports events in Australia
1989,Australian Open